A by-election was held in the Dáil Éireann Dublin South-Central constituency in Ireland on 9 June 1994. It followed the resignation of Fianna Fáil Teachta Dála (TD) and Minister for Health John O'Connell on health grounds.

The election was won by Dublin City Councillor and former TD Eric Byrne. This was the first time ever Democratic Left won a by-election.

Among the candidates were Senator and future TD Michael Mulcahy, Brian Hayes who would go on to serve as both a Minister of State and MEP, Dublin City Councillor Joe Connolly and South Dublin County Councillor and future Senator Cáit Keane.

On the same day, a by-election took place in Mayo West.

Result

See also
List of Dáil by-elections
Dáil constituencies

References

External links
https://www.electionsireland.org/result.cfm?election=1992B&cons=177
http://irelandelection.com/election.php?elecid=147&constitid=22&electype=2

1994 in Irish politics
27th Dáil
By-elections in the Republic of Ireland
Elections in County Dublin
June 1994 events in Europe
1994 Dublin South-Central by-election